The University of Zalingei is located in Central Darfur State, where the headquarters settled in Zalingei town. It was established in March 1994 as a public university.

It was funded by the Ministry of Higher Education and Scientific Research.
As of September 2011, the university is a member in good standing of the Association of African Universities.

Faculties, institutes and centers

Faculty of Agriculture 
The faculty awards the degree of bachelor of science (honors ) in agriculture after successfully completion of prescribed curriculum within ten semesters in the following specializations:-

Crop Sciences, Agricultural Economics, Horticulture, Crop protection, Animal production Agricultural Engineering, Food Technology, Agric. Extension and Rural Development.

Faculty of Forestry Sciences 
The faculty awards the degree of bachelor of sciences (honors ) in Forestry, Range, and wildlife after successfully completion of prescribed curriculum within ten semesters.

Faculty of Education 
The faculty qualify for the degree of bachelor in Education and Science, Education and Arts after successfully completion of eight semesters

Faculty Departments: Biology, Chemistry, Physics, Mathematics, Geography, History, Arabic Language, English Language, Islamic Studies, and Psychology

The faculty also awards bachelor (honors) in different above specializations to the distinguished after successfully completion of ten semesters.

Faculty of Education – basic Level 
The faculty awards the degree bachelor of Education (honors) in Science and Mathematics and Education after successfully completion of prescribed curriculum within eight semesters

The faculty includes these department: Education and Psychological Sciences and Mathematics, Social Sciences, Language and Islamic studies.

Faculty of Languages and Linguistic Sciences 
The faculty qualify for the degree of bachelor in Arabic and English Languages after successfully completion of eight semesters. The faculty also awards bachelor (honors) in Arabic and English Language to the distinguished students after successfully completion of ten semesters, the faculty includes these department : Arabic Language and English Language

Faculty of Economic and Administrative Sciences 
The faculty qualify for the degree of bachelor in Economics, Accounting and Business Administration after successfully completion of eight semesters.

The faculty also awards bachelor (honors) in Economics, Accounting and Business Administration to the distinguished students after successfully completion of ten semesters.

The faculty includes the following department: Economics, Accounting and Business Administration

Faculty of Medicine 
The faculty awards the degree of bachelor in Medicine and surgery after successfully completion of prescribed curriculum within twelve semesters.

Faculty of Health Sciences 
The faculty awards the degree of bachelor in Public Health, and Sciences of Nursing  after successfully completion of prescribed curriculum within Ten semesters.

Faculty of Technology Sciences 
The Faculty awards the degree of Diploma in Accounting and Financial management, and Information Technology after successfully completion of prescribed curriculum within six semesters.

Faculty of community Development 
The faculty qualifies for different certificates after successfully attending short training courses in different field of community needs.

College of Graduate Studies and Scientific Research 
The Faculty awards higher degree (Diploma, Master, and Doctorate) in different field of science after successfully completion of prescribed curriculum.

Institute of peace Studies and Development 
The institute concerned with peace studies, conflict resolution, gender issues, woman and Child Care, Human rights and social development. Institute also awards higher degrees ( Diploma, Master and Doctorate) in above mentioned fields of studies .

Jebel Marra Institute for Research and African Studies 
The institute concerned with researches in national traditions and heritage, folklore, norms, folkways and social African studies.

Institute also awards higher degree (Diploma, Master and Doctorate) in above mentioned fields of studies

Institute Of Holy Quran and the origination of Science 
The institute concerned with researches in the Quran and sciences related, hadith, fegh and origination of science .

The Institute also awards higher degrees (Diploma, Master and Doctorate) in above mentioned fields of studies.

Centre for Environment and Technology Transfer:

The centre deals with research in the field of environment and environment conservation, drought problems, soil erosion, desertification and climate change. the centre also deals with transfer of technology compatible with environment and community needs .

Administrations and units

Strategic Planning Unit 
The unit was established in 2008, to follow up the Strategic Plans of the university in cooperation with the various university departments.

Center for Information and Statistics 
The center was established in 2011 to achieve the following objectives:

- Establish database for administrative units, Faculties, institutes, centers and computerizing students' academic activities.

- Linking the university to the virtual library network of Sudanese universities, international universities, interactive video conferences and live broadcast.

Administration of Public Relations and Information 
The administration was established in 2015 to achieve the following objectives:

- Achieve the general objectives of the university articulated in the act.  

- Raising community awareness to the importance issues addressed by the university.

- Raising community awareness on the University's philosophy, mission and goals.

Administration of Scientific Research 
The administration was established in 2015 to achieve the following objectives:

- Encouraging scientific research at the university.

- Create and disseminate appropriate environment for research.

- Building research capacity for teaching staff and technicians at the university.

- Publication of scientific journals in the university and help researchers for publication.

Administration of External Relations 
The administration of External relations was established in 2015, to implement the instructions of the Ministry of Higher Education and Scientific Research to organize the activities of universities and its foreign relations. The administration work  to introduced the university and building partnerships between the university and other academic institutions, professional associations locally, regionally and internationally.

Administration of Services 
Established in 2016 to achieve the following objectives:

- Provide general services in coordination with the general administration of the university, including water, electricity and sanitation services in the various university compounds.

References

Universities and colleges in Sudan
Central Darfur
Educational institutions established in 1994
1994 establishments in Sudan